Lésigny is a commune in the Seine-et-Marne département in the Île-de-France region in the south-eastern suburbs of Paris, France.

The town is well known for its affluence and for the Château de Grande Romaine, which hosted the Brazil national football team during FIFA World Cup 1998, as well as famous European football teams such as Paris Saint-Germain FC, Olympique de Marseille, AS Monaco FC and Chelsea FC. Since becoming residential, Lésigny has hosted many celebrities. Many movies and advertisements were filmed in Lésigny's Americanized districts.

Geography
Lésigny is 22 km to the east of Paris in the department of Seine-et-Marne. It is a suburban area bordering the forest of Notre-Dame. 267 hectares of the forest's 2200 hectares are in the territory of Lésigny.

Demographics

Inhabitants are called Lésigniens.

Suburban development

The suburban development of Lésigny was initiated in 1968 by American real estate developer William Levitt. Two housing projects were established by Levitt, completely separated from the little village of Lésigny: Le Parc de Lésigny (600 detached houses) and L'Orée de Lésigny (276 semi-detached houses). Its American character was augmented by the presence of a private swimming pool and tennis court. Due to this development, the population of the commune sharply increased from 362 in 1968 to 6,572 in 1975.

Twin towns
 Leingarten, Germany, since 1975.
 Asola, Italy, since 2004.

See also
Communes of the Seine-et-Marne department

References

External links

 Official site 
 

Communes of Seine-et-Marne